The 2014 College Basketball Invitational (CBI) was a single-elimination tournament of 16 National Collegiate Athletic Association (NCAA) Division I teams that did not participate in the NCAA Tournament or the NIT. The opening games were held on Tuesday, March 18 and Wednesday, March 19. After the quarterfinals, the bracket was reseeded. A best-of-three championship series between the eventual winner Siena College and the loser Fresno State was held on March 31, April 2, and April 5 in a best of three series. Games were televised by the CBS Sports Network.

Participants
The following teams were announced as participants on Sunday, March 16, after the NCAA Selection Show.

Declined invitations 
The following programs declined an invitation to participate in the CBI:

 Indiana
 St. Bonaventure

Schedule

Bracket

Home teams listed second.
During the finals, Siena hosted games 2 and 3 at Alumni Recreation Center instead of their normal home site at Times Union Center.

References

College Basketball Invitational
College Basketball Invitational